Uriel Sebree Hall (April 12, 1852 – December 30, 1932) was a U.S. Representative from Missouri, son of William Augustus Hall and nephew of Willard Preble Hall.

Born near Huntsville, Missouri, Hall was tutored privately and was graduated from Mount Pleasant College, Huntsville, Missouri, in 1873.
He served as superintendent of schools at Moberly, Missouri.
Founded an academy at Prairie Hill, Missouri, and served as its president.
He studied law.
He was admitted to the bar in 1879 and practiced in Moberly, Missouri, until 1885, when he engaged in agricultural pursuits near Hubbard, Missouri.

Hall was elected as a Democrat to the Fifty-third and Fifty-fourth Congresses (March 4, 1893 – March 3, 1897).
He declined to be a candidate for renomination in 1896.
He served as president of Pritchett College, Glasgow, Missouri from 1905 to 1917.
He moved to Columbia, Missouri, in 1918 and founded the Hall West Point-Annapolis Coaching School, serving as its president and supervisor from 1918 to 1930, when he retired.
He died in Columbia, Missouri, December 30, 1932.
He was interred in Oakland Cemetery, Moberly, Missouri.

References

1852 births
1932 deaths
Heads of universities and colleges in the United States
Democratic Party members of the United States House of Representatives from Missouri
People from Huntsville, Missouri
People from Glasgow, Missouri
People from Columbia, Missouri
People from Moberly, Missouri